Botswana competed at the 1990 Commonwealth Games. They sent twenty-three athletes in two sports, including their first participation in a field event.

Sources
 Official results by country

Botswana at the Commonwealth Games
Nations at the 1990 Commonwealth Games
Commonwealth Games